The 2017 Suruga Bank Championship was the tenth edition of the Suruga Bank Championship (also referred to as the J.League Cup / Copa Sudamericana Championship Final), the club football match co-organized by the Japan Football Association, the football governing body of Japan, CONMEBOL, the football governing body of South America, and J.League, the professional football league of Japan, between the champions of the previous season's J.League Cup and Copa Sudamericana.

The match was contested between Japanese team Urawa Red Diamonds, the 2016 J.League Cup champions, and Brazilian team Chapecoense, the 2016 Copa Sudamericana champions. It was hosted by Urawa Red Diamonds at the Saitama Stadium 2002 in Saitama, Japan on 15 August 2017.

Urawa Red Diamonds defeated Chapecoense 1–0 to win their first Suruga Bank Championship title.

Teams

Venue

Format
The Suruga Bank Championship was played as a single match, with the J.League Cup winners hosting the match. If tied at the end of regulation, extra time would not be played, and the penalty shoot-out would be used to determine the winner. A maximum of seven substitutions may be made during the match.

Match

Details

See also
2016 J.League Cup Final
2016 Copa Sudamericana Finals

References

External links
スルガ銀行チャンピオンシップ2017, Japan Football Association 
スルガ銀行チャンピオンシップ2017, J.League 
Copa Suruga Bank, CONMEBOL.com 

2017
2017 in Japanese football
2017 in South American football
Urawa Red Diamonds matches
Associação Chapecoense de Futebol matches
2017 in Brazilian football
August 2017 sports events in Asia